French Radio London (FRL) is a commercial radio station located in London and broadcasting to the Greater London Area on the Internet.  Launched in November 2010, the station remains the only UK based French speaking terrestrial radio station.  It aims to provide a cultural link for the French-speaking community in London. Its slogan is "The French Voice of London" or "La voix Française de Londres".

The chief executive is Pascal Grierson, who has previous radio experience with GWR.

FRL broadcasts radio shows presented by Rachel Bourlier (Rachel&Co talk-show), Eric Gendry (La Newsroom), Maia Morgensztern (Culture FRL), Marie Dosiere (Balade Chromatique), Frank McWeeny (French Toast) and many more.

FRL's audience
As for the editorial prospect, FRL's audience is divided between French listeners and francophiles.  At the beginning of 2015, the audience of FRL grew to 100,000 listeners per week.

Presenters
Rachel Bourlier, Marie Dosiere, Eric Gendry, Maïa Morgensztern, Marie Lahetjuzan, Laurent Pastor, Frank McWeeny, Laurent Shark, Antoine Ecalle, Eric Coudert, Olivier Jauffrit, Parris.

Shows 

RACHEL & CO – 
This talk show presented by Rachel Bourlier invites French or foreign guests to discusses economic and social issues, international and French politics, as well as news from the worlds of cinema, music, theatre, sports and many others ...

LA NEWSROOM – 
In this show, Éric Gendry takes a look at the news in France and the United Kingdom by deciphering interviews and reports. The Newsroom also aims to create links within the French community in London by including columns about life in the English capital and by interacting with listeners.

CULTURE FRL – 
The cultural programme produced and presented by Maïa Morgensztern that takes you to the Art scene, in its myriad forms. Discover each week the guests who make or break the world of culture and catch up with the current debate questions, previews of films, latest music trends and the designers to watch out for...

LE LABO DES SAVOIRS – 
Along with visiting researchers in our studios, Guillaume Mésière provides reports, documentaries, chronicles and an assortment of sounds to help activate of your synapses.

BALADE CHROMATIQUE - 
Marie Dosière helps us discover unique musical styles from a particular era based on her inspirations as a fan and musician, accompanied by a specialist on the subject.

PARIS CHANSON – 
Close your eyes and be transported instantly to the heart of 1940s and 50s Paris.

SPOTLIGHT – 
French Radio London is proud to promote the living French culture and art in all its forms with the French and Francophile community in London. 'Spotlight' highlights French entrepreneurs who live and succeed in London.

References

External links

 
 Podcasts shows
  

2010 establishments in England
Digital-only radio stations
Radio stations established in 2010
Radio stations in London